Route 69 is a primary north–south state highway in the U.S. state of Connecticut connecting the city of New Haven to the city of Bristol in the western part of Greater Hartford, passing through Greater Waterbury along the way. The route extends north of Bristol as a secondary route into the town of Burlington.

Route description
Route 69 begins in the Amity neighborhood of New Haven as the continuation of Whalley Avenue, splitting off from Route 63, which continues along Amity Road. It soon crosses under the Wilbur Cross Parkway with an interchange at the Woodbridge town line. Past the Parkway, the road becomes known as Litchfield Turnpike and heads northward along the western side of West Rock. Route 69 then enters the town of Bethany, where the route leaves the Litchfield Turnpike to head along Carrington Road. Several miles later, Route 69 enters the town of Prospect with the road becoming known as New Haven Road. North of Prospect center, the road becomes Prospect Road as it heads towards the city of Waterbury. In Waterbury, the road continues along Hamilton Avenue, meeting with I-84, then turning right onto Silver Street, later becoming Meriden Road. Route 69 leaves Meriden Road following Woodtick Road and Stillson Road, then turns right onto Wolcott Street.

Wolcott Street becomes Wolcott Road as Route 69 crosses from Waterbury into the town of Wolcott. Route 69 intersects with Route 322 in the town center then continues north towards the city of Bristol. In central Bristol, the route turns onto West Street, intersecting with Route 72 and U.S. Route 6. After a brief  overlap with Route 6, Route 69 continues its northward journey along Burlington Avenue. After the junction with Route 6, the road becomes a secondary, minor arterial road as it heads into the town of Burlington. In Burlington, the road name changes to Milford Street and eventually ends at a junction with Route 4 near the town center of Burlington.

History
Parts of modern Route 69 belonged to two separate state highways in the 1920s. The road from Prospect to Waterbury was designated as State Highway 348, while the road from Waterbury to Bristol was known as State Highway 172. Route 69 was created in the 1932 state highway renumbering as a direct route from New Haven to Waterbury. It used the southernmost portion of the old Litchfield Turnpike (local name for the Straits Turnpike) from the Amity section of New Haven to Bethany, then former town roads from Bethany to Prospect (Carrington Road and New Haven Road), and then former State Highway 348 from Prospect to East Main Street (then  Route 14) in Waterbury. The section from Waterbury to Bristol (former State Highway 172) was renumbered to Route 119 in 1932. In 1934, Route 69 was extended to Bristol (at Route 6), taking over former Route 119. In 1962, a further extension north to Burlington (at Route 4) using former unsigned SR 787 was made. At the same time, the route in Waterbury was shifted slightly east (from Wolcott Street to Woodtick Road) for better through traffic flow.

Junction list

References

External links

069
Transportation in New Haven County, Connecticut
Transportation in Hartford County, Connecticut